Blågårds Plads (lit. "Blue House Square") is a public square attached to Blågårdsgade, a side street to Nørrebrogade in the Nørrebro district of Copenhagen, Denmark. It is a popular venue for events and various activities in the summer time.

History

The square takes its name from a country estate, Blågård (English: Blue House), which was established at the site by Christoffer Gabel in the middle of the 17th century on the grounds of a former brickyard. Later owners included Ulrik Frederik Gyldenløve, Prince Charles and Peter von Scholten.

In 1827 the owner obtained a license from King Frederick VI to convert the property into an iron foundry. From 1852 to 1889, Copenhagen's old fortification ring was gradually decommissioned and the area began to undergo rapid urbanization, becoming one of the densest and poorest parts of the city.

The foundry's highly polluting activities posed a severe health hazard and the neighbourhood became known as the Black Square (Danish: Den Sorte Firkant).

In 1898 the City acquired the property to turn it into a public space. The first square was laid out in 1902, enclosed by two rows of large-leaved Linden trees.

In the 1980s, the old buildings on two sides of the square were demolished and replaced by new houses.

Buildings

 
Blågård Church is located on the north side of the square. It was built in 1926 to a design by Andreas Clemmensen and Johan Nielsen, replacing a temporary church by Martin Nyrop from 1905.

The church is flanked by two buildings from circa 1900. The buildings on the two other sides are from the early 1980s.

Kai Nielsen sculptures
The space is dominated by 22 granite figures integrated in a low granite wall enclosing a depressed, rectangular section in the centre of the square. Designed by sculptor Kai Nielsen in collaboration with the architect Ivar Bentsen, they depict people plying a trade—a tailor, a cooper, a barber and a baker etc.—all in the company of a toddler. In the corners stand larger figure groups depicting playing children.

Blågårds Plads today
With a community centre, a library and several popular cafés, Blågårds Plads is a focal point for the life of the surrounding neighbourhood which is still known as the Black Square. The depressed central section serves as a football field in summer and features an ice-skating rink in winter.

References

External links

 Pictures of Kai Nielsen's statues
 Source

Squares in Copenhagen
Streets in Nørrebro
Listed buildings and structures in Nørrebro
1902 establishments in Denmark